The Tirumantiram or Thirumantiram is a Tamil poetic work, written either in the 6th century CE or post 10th century CE by Tirumular. It is the tenth of the twelve volumes of the Tirumurai, the key texts of Shaiva Siddhanta and the first known Tamil work to use the term. The Tirumantiram is the earliest known exposition of the Shaiva Agamas in Tamil. It consists of over three thousand verses dealing with various aspects of spirituality, ethics and praise of Shiva. But it is more spiritual than religious and one can see the difference between Vedanta and Siddhanta from Tirumular's interpretation of the Mahavakyas. According to historian Venkatraman, the work covers almost every feature of the siddhar of the Tamils. According to another historian, Madhavan, the work stresses on the fundamentals of Siddha medicine and its healing powers. It deals with a wide array of subjects including astronomy and physical culture.

Etymology 
Tirumantiram's literal meaning is "sacred mantra" or "holy incantation."

Content

The Tirumantiram is divided into nine chapters, 9 tantras:

 1. Philosophical views and divine experience, impermanency of the physical body, love, education etc.
 2. Shiva's glory, His divine acts, classification of souls etc.
 3. Yoga practices according to the eight-angled way of Patanjali. Also refers to Vasi Yoga
 4. Mantra, tantra, etc.
 5. Various branches of Saiva religion; the four elements of Shaiva Siddhanta.
 6. Shiva as guru bestowing grace and the devotee's responsibility.
 7. Shiva linga, Shiva worship, self-control.
 8. The stages of soul experience.
 9. Panchadsara manthiram, Shiva's dance, the state of samadhi.

The poems have a unique metrical structure, each line consisting of 11 or 12 syllables depending on the initial syllable.  Tirumular discusses the four steps of spiritual progress; Charya, Kriya, Yoga and Gnana, the Shaiva Siddhanta concept of Pati, Pasu and Pasa where Pati stands for Shiva, Pasu stands for the humankind and Pasa stands for Maya (the desire), sadhana, Vedanta, the Upanishadic Tat tvam asi and other Vedantic concepts, the transcendental reality as  emptiness (Sunya) devoid of any attribute and Tantrasastra (Shakti worship), chakras, magic spells and their accessories.

The section on Yoga, called "Shiva yoga", offers details not found in the Sanskrit text of Patanjali. The Tirumantiram describes means of attaining an immortal body (kaya siddhi), advocating a theory of preserving the body so that the soul would continue its existence.

Tirumular is not only one of the 63 Nayanmars (Nayanars) but also a significant one among the 18 Siddhars. Tirumular has been referred to as "Nampiran" (meaning: nam-Our, piran-God, thus thirumular has been called as a leader or god to all the remaining Nayanars) by Sundarar in his thiru thondar thogai (the earliest song which mentions the names of 63 Nayanars). Tirumular as a moral philosopher teaches the ethics of non-violence (ahimsa), abstinence from slaughtering, meat and alcohol. He condemns coveting another man's wife. He declares that "love is God", proclaims the unity of mankind and God and stresses the acquisition of knowledge.

The final section of the Tirumantiram, named Sunya Sambhashana ("Colloquy on the Void"), is full of metaphorical sayings communicating mystical and speculative thoughts, for example;

See also

 Arutprakasa Vallalar Chidambaram Ramalinga Swamigal (Vallalar)
 Tirumular
 Agastyar

References

Sources
 A Short Introduction: The Tamil Siddhas and the Siddha Medicine of Tamil Nadu By Marion Zimmermann
 The Encyclopaedia Of Indian Literature (Volume Five (Sasay To Zorgot), Volume 5 By Mohan Lal
 The Encyclopaedia Of Indian Literature (Volume Two) (Devraj To Jyoti), Volume 2 By Amaresh Datta
 Saivism in Philosophical Perspective: A Study of the Formative Concepts, Problems and Methods of Saiva Siddhanta By K. Sivaraman
 A dictionary of Indian literature, Volume 1 By Sujit Mukherjee
 The Tirumandiram,  (set of 10 volumes) English translation with commentary, 2010, T.N. Ganapathy et al.
 The Yoga of Tirumular: Essays on the Tirumandiram, by T.N. Ganapathy and K.R. Arumugam,

External links 
Tirumantiram in English, translated by Dr. B. Natarajan
 Tirumantiram in Tamil Unicode format: Tirumantiram
 Shavism Homepage
 Thirumandhiram
 Thirumandiram information by Marshall Govindan
 The Tirumandiram in English and Tamil with verse by verse commentary, in 10 volumes, by T.N. Ganapathy et al

Tamil-language literature
Texts related to Nayanar saints

Tamil Hindu literature